"Point of No Return" is a song by German Eurodance group Centory, released in August 1994 as the lead single from their only album, Alpha Centory (1994). It features Durron Maurice Butler, known as Turbo B from Snap!, who also co-wrote the lyrics.

Chart performance
"Point of No Return" was a sizeable hit in Europe, becoming a top 10 hit in both Finland and Italy. Additionally, it peaked at number 16 in Germany, number 18 in Austria and number 19 in France. In the United Kingdom, the single reached number 67 in its first week at the UK Singles Chart, on December 11, 1994, while on the Eurochart Hot 100, it went to number 57 in October 1994.

Music video
The accompanying music video for "Point of No Return" was directed by Oliver Sommer and Manuela Hiller. It was A-listed on France's MCM in December 1994 and on Germany's VIVA in October same year.

Track listings

 CD single, UK
 "Point of No Return" (Radio Version) – 4:20
 "Point of No Return" (The 12 Inch) – 6:13
 "Point of No Return" (Mutrone Club Mix) – 7:20
 "Point of No Return" (Trime 'N Delgado Remix) – 7:22

 CD maxi, Netherlands
 "Point of No Return" (Radio Version) – 4:20	
 "Point of No Return" (The 12 Inch) – 6:13	
 "Point of No Return" (Mutrone Club Mix) – 7:20

Charts

References

1994 debut singles
1994 songs
Centory songs
EMI Records singles
English-language German songs
Music videos directed by Oliver Sommer